A  or imperial forest was an area of historic woodland which existed in the Holy Roman Empire and was under direct imperial control, protection and usage. 

 may refer to:

 , a nature reserve near Nuremberg
 , a section of the Nuremberg , which takes its name from the associated church dedicated to the local forest hermit, Saint Sebald (or Sebaldus)
 , a German state forest in North Rhine-Westphalia
 Kaufungen Forest, a protected natural area on the border between the states of Hesse and Lower Saxony in central Germany

See also
 
 Rychvald